XHKW-FM is a radio station on 89.3 FM in Morelia, Michoacán.

History
XESF-AM 1300 received its concession on September 22, 1939. It was owned by José Martínez Ramírez until 1968, when it was sold to Francisco Rivanedeyra Hinojosa. In the 1980s, ownership of XEKW was transferred to Grupo ACIR. ACIR shed the station in 2008, selling it to Corporación Morelia Multimedia, a subsidiary of Multimundo, which is owned by Emilio Nassar Rodríguez and Jaime Robledo Castellanos, to finally, in July 2013, become part of the most consolidated media group in audiovisual media in the city: Grupo CB Multiplataforma.

XEKW was cleared to move to FM in 2011. Despite being in the same city as XHKW-TDT, it is not related to XHKW and has not been commonly owned with the TV station since 1968.

References

Radio stations in Michoacán